Dmitri Anatolyevich Lyskov (born 24 September 1987), is a Russian futsal player who plays for Gazprom-Ugra Yugorsk and the Russian national futsal team.

References

External links
UEFA profile
AMFR profile

1987 births
Living people
Russian men's futsal players
People from Glazov
Sportspeople from Udmurtia